The Unlikely Ones is a novel by Mary Brown published in 1986.

Plot summary
The Unlikely Ones is a novel in which the characters quest to return the property of a dragon.

Reception
Dave Langford reviewed The Unlikely Ones for White Dwarf #78, and stated that "the book has modest charm and a fresh style, but everything glides along with the happy predictability of a Mills & Boon romance. I'd rate it higher if only there were a few genuine surprises".

Reviews
Review by Pauline Morgan (1986) in Fantasy Review, June 1986
Review by Mary Frances Zambreno (1986) in American Fantasy, Fall 1986
Review by Glenn Reed (1987) in Fantasy Review, January-February 1987
Review by Faren Miller (1987) in Locus, #312 January 1987
Review by David V. Barrett (1987) in Vector 136
Review by Baird Searles (1987) in Isaac Asimov's Science Fiction Magazine, June 1987
Review by Don D'Ammassa (1988) in Science Fiction Chronicle, #102 March 1988

References

1986 novels